Igor Janik (born 18 January 1983 in Gdynia) is a male javelin thrower from Poland. His personal best throw is 84.76m achieved in 2008.

Competition record

Seasonal bests by year
2000 - 62.41
2001 - 75.03
2002 - 78.90
2003 - 82.54
2004 - 69.39
2005 - 77.25
2006 - 82.86
2007 - 83.38
2008 - 84.76
2009 - 83.52
2010 - 80.83
2011 - 82.81
2012 - 82.37
2013 - 80.13

References

External links
 
 Profile at Beijing 2008 official website

1983 births
Living people
Polish male javelin throwers
Athletes (track and field) at the 2008 Summer Olympics
Athletes (track and field) at the 2012 Summer Olympics
Olympic athletes of Poland
Sportspeople from Gdynia
Universiade medalists in athletics (track and field)
Universiade gold medalists for Poland
Universiade silver medalists for Poland
Universiade bronze medalists for Poland
Medalists at the 2003 Summer Universiade
Medalists at the 2007 Summer Universiade
Medalists at the 2011 Summer Universiade
21st-century Polish people